George III (died 27 March 1184), of the Bagrationi dynasty, was the 8th King of Georgia from 1156 to 1184. He became king when his father, Demetrius I, died in 1156, which was preceded by his brother's revolt against their father in 1154. His reign was part of what would be called the Georgian Golden Age – a historical period in the High Middle Ages, during which the Kingdom of Georgia reached the peak of its military power and development. George was the father of Queen Tamar the Great.

Life
He succeeded on his father Demetrius I's death in 1156. He changed his father's defensive policy into a more aggressive one and resumed offensive against the neighboring Seljuqid rulers in Armenia. The same year he ascended to the throne, George launched a successful campaign against the Shah-Armens. It may be said that the Shah-Armen took part in almost all the campaigns undertaken against Georgia between 1130s to 1160s. Moreover, Shah-Armens enlisted the assistance of Georgian feudals disaffected with the Georgian monarchs and gave them asylum. 

In 1156 the Ani's Christian population rose against the emir Fakr al-Din Shaddad, a vassal of George III, and turned the town over to his brother Fadl ibn Mahmud. But Fadl, too, apparently could not satisfy the people of Ani, and this time the town was offered to the George III, who took advantage of this offer and subjugated Ani, appointing his general Ivane Orbeli as its ruler in 1161. A coalition consisting of the ruler of Ahlat, Shah-Armen Sökmen II, the ruler of Diyarbekir, Kotb ad-Din il-Ghazi, Al-Malik of Erzerum, and others was formed as soon as the Georgians seized the town, but the latter defeated the allies. He then marched against one of the members of the coalition, the king of Erzerum, and in the same year, 1161, defeated and made him prisoner, but then released him for a large ransom. The capture of Ani and the defeat of the Saltukid-forces enabled the Georgian king to march on Dvin. The following year in August/September 1162, Dvin was temporarily occupied and sacked, the non-Christian population was pillaged and the Georgian troops returned home loaded with booty. The king appointed Ananiya, a member of the local feudal nobility to govern the town. 

A coalition of Muslim rulers led by Ildeniz, ruler of Adarbadagan and some other regions, embarked upon a campaign against Georgia in early 1163. He was joined by the Shah-Armen Sökmen II, Ak-Sunkur, ruler of Maragha, and others. With an army of 50,000 troops they marched on Georgia. The Georgian army was defeated. The enemy took the fortress of Gagi, laid waste as far as the region of Gagi and Gegharkunik, seized prisoners and booty, and then moved to Ani. The Muslim rulers were jubilant, and they prepared for a new campaign. However, this time they were forestalled by George III, who marched into Arran at the beginning of 1166, occupied a region extending to Ganja, devastated the land and turn back with prisoners and booty. In 1167, George III marched to defend his vassal Shah Aghsartan of Shirvan against the Khazar and Kipchak assaults and strengthened the Georgian dominance in the area.

There seemed to be no end to the war between George III and atabeg Eldiguz. But the belligerents were exhausted to such an extent that Eldiguz proposed an armistice. George had no choice but to make peace. He restored Ani to its former rulers, the Shaddadids, who became his vassals. The Shaddadids, ruled the town for about 10 years, but in 1174 King George took the Shahanshah ibn Mahmud as a prisoner and occupied Ani once again. Ivane Orbeli, was appointed governor of the town. Throughout this period, the Georgian army was swelling with Armenian volunteers, enthusiastically participating in the Iiberation of their country. 

In 1177, the nobles of the realm attempted to replace George with his nephew Demna. Being a son of George III's late elder brother David V, Demna was considered by many as a legitimate pretender to the Georgian throne. Approximately 30,000 rebel forces under Demna's father-in-law Ivane Orbeli strengthened their positions at the citadel of Lore. Ivane decided to request aid from neighbouring kingdoms. In particular, they requested aid from Shah-Armens and Eldiguzids, but no assistance was forthcoming. George III was able to crush the revolt and embarked on a crackdown campaign on the defiant aristocratic clans; Demna was blinded and castrated and most of his in-laws murdered. Ivane Orbeli was put to death and the surviving members of his family were driven out of Georgia. Sargis I Mkhargrdzeli was appointed as a governor of Ani.

In 1178, George III appointed his daughter and heiress Tamar as co-ruler to forestall any succession dispute. 
When he died in 1184, she continued as the sole ruler. He was buried at Gelati Monastery, western Georgia.

Marriage and children
In ca. 1155, George married Burdukhan (Gurandukht), daughter of Khuddan, King of Alania. They had two daughters:

Tamar, who succeeded him as ruler.
Rusudan, married Manuel Komnenos (born 1145), the eldest son of Andronikos I who was briefly Byzantine emperor. Rusudan and Manuel were the parents of Alexios and David, founders of the Empire of Trebizond.

See also
List of Georgian Kings

External links

The unification of feudal Georgia

Kings of Georgia
1184 deaths
Eastern Orthodox monarchs
Year of birth unknown
Bagrationi dynasty of the Kingdom of Georgia